Robert Jones Friend (February 29, 1920 – June 21, 2019) was an American military officer and pilot who served with the Tuskegee Airmen during World War II and led the USAF's Project Blue Book from 1958 to 1963. He also served during the Korean War and the Vietnam War. He had a 28-year military career.

Early life and education
Friend was born in Columbia, South Carolina on February 29, 1920. From an early age, he loved airplanes and wanted to sign up to fly for the army, but he was turned away because he was black. He attended Lincoln University in Pennsylvania and studied aviation.

Military career
During World War II, Friend had 142 combat missions. After WWII began the army began a segregated program for black pilots in Tuskegee, Alabama. Friend immediately signed up and completed training. The U.S. Army Air Corps commissioned him as an officer in the 332nd Fighter Group. He was sent to Africa and later Europe.

After World War II, Friend stayed in the service and eventually served in the Korean and Vietnam War. He was in the military for a total of 28 years. He was a graduate of the Air Force Institute of Technology.

Air Force study on UFOs
Friend said he believed in the possibility of extraterrestrial life in the universe. Friend led Project Blue Book, a classified U.S. Air Force study on UFOs. The project was started in 1952 and shut down in 1969 even though 701 documented incidents remain a mystery.

Awards
2 Distinguished Flying Crosses (United States) 
Bronze Star Medal ribbon
U.S. Army Presidential Unit Citation ribbon
3 U.S. Army Distinguished Service Medal ribbons
The Air Medal
Congressional Gold Medal awarded to the Tuskegee Airmen in 2006

Death
Lt. Col. Friend died on June 21, 2019, in Long Beach, California at the age of 99 due to sepsis, according to his daughter. At the time, he was one of 12 remaining Tuskegee Airmen. He had flown 142 combat missions in World War II as part of the elite group of fighter pilots trained at Alabama's Tuskegee Institute. A public viewing and memorial was held at the Palm Springs Air Museum on July 6.  He had spoken about his experiences in many different events prior to his death, such as in John Murdy Elementary School's "The Gratitude Project" in Garden Grove.

See also 

 Executive Order 9981
 List of Tuskegee Airmen
 List of Tuskegee Airmen Cadet Pilot Graduation Classes
 Military history of African Americans

References

External links
 Fly (2009 play about the 332d Fighter Group)
 Tuskegee Airmen at Tuskegee University
 Tuskegee Airmen Archives at the University of California, Riverside Libraries.
 Tuskegee Airmen, Inc.
 Tuskegee Airmen National Historic Site (U.S. National Park Service) 
 Tuskegee Airmen National Museum

1920 births
2019 deaths
Congressional Gold Medal recipients
Lincoln University (Pennsylvania) alumni
Recipients of the Distinguished Flying Cross (United States)
Tuskegee Airmen
Ufologists
United States Army Air Forces pilots of World War II
United States Air Force officers
University of California, Los Angeles alumni
21st-century African-American people